, better known by his stage name , is a Japanese voice actor who is affiliated with Arts Vision.

Filmography

Anime television series
Dirty Pair (1985) (Goolley)
Kyatto Ninden Teyandee (1990) (Kitsunezuka Ko'on-no-Kami)
Berserk (1997) as Boscogne
Turn A Gundam (1999) as Ladderum Kune
Cyborg 009 (2002) as Dr. Gaia
Divergence Eve (2003) (Wolfgang Woerns)
Misaki Chronicles (2004) (Wolfgang Woerns)
Ouran High School Host Club (2006) (Renge's Father)
Darker than Black (2007) as Mao
Darker Than Black: Ryūsei no Gemini (2009) as Mao
Naruto: Shippuden (2009) as Hanzo of the Salamander
Kyoukai no Kanata (2013) as Grandfather Nase
One Piece (2014) as Fujitora (Issho)
Legend of the Galactic Heroes: Die Neue These (2018) as Gregor von Mückenberger
Carole & Tuesday (2019) as Hamilton

Unknown date
The Brave Fighter of Legend Da-Garn (Shuttle Saber, Redlone)
Flame of Recca (Gashakura)
Highschool! Kimen-gumi (Gorō Mutsu)
Red Baron (Kaizer)
Rurouni Kenshin (Koshijirō Kamiya, Tsuruzaemon)
Pretty Soldier Sailor Moon SuperS (Ichirō Ōno)
Saint Seiya (Canis Major Sirius)
Sakigake!! Otokojuku (Ninja (Tetsu Kabuto), Wang Ta Ren)
Sexy Commando Gaiden: Sugoiyo! Masaru-san (Takeda-sensei)
Sorcerous Stabber Orphen (Bagup)
Star Ocean EX (Ronix J. Kenni)
Tenchi Universe (Sasami and Ayeka's Uncle)
Transformers: The Headmasters (Fortress/Fortress Maximus)
Transformers: Super-God Masterforce (Grand/Grand Maximus)
Transformers: Micron Legend (Ratchet)
Yokoyama Mitsuteru Sangokushi (Yuan Shao)
You're Under Arrest (Inspector Tokuno)

Original video animations
Baoh (????) (Number 22)
Bondage Queen Kate (????) (Boss)
Gatchaman (1994) (Dr. Kōzaburō Nambu)
Gunsmith Cats (????) (Roy Coleman)
Guyver (????) (ZX-Tole)
Magical Girl Pretty Sammy (1996) (High Priest)
One Piece - Defeat The Pirate Ganzak! (1998) (Herring, Narration)
The Deep Blue Fleet (????) (Heinrich von Hitler)
Ys: Tenkuu no Shinden (????) (Gōban)
Legend of the Galactic Heroes(1997) (Guzmán)

Game
Flash Hiders (1993) (Rablehalt)
Kunoichi (2003) (Jimushi)
Kingdom Hearts II (2005) (MCP)
Ace Combat Zero (2006) (Dietrich Kellerman)
Metal Gear Solid 2: Bande Dessinee (2008) (Revolver Ocelot)

Drama CDs
Last Order (????) (Hiroshi Shiho)

Tokusatsu
Kyuukyuu Sentai GoGo-V (1999) (Dark Demon Sword Psyma Beast Solgoil (ep. 4))
Ultraman Neos (2000) (Narrator)
Samurai Sentai Shinkenger (2009) (Ayakashi Isagitsune (ep. 17))
Samurai Sentai Shinkenger vs. Go-onger: GinmakuBang!! (2010) (Tensouder Voice)
Tensou Sentai Goseiger (2010) (Master Head (eps. 2-5, 10, 12, 16, 18, 22, 24, 29, 32, 45-50), Tensouder Voice, Narrator)
Tensou Sentai Goseiger: Epic on the Movie (2010) (Tensouder Voice)
Tensou Sentai Goseiger vs. Shinkenger: Epic on Ginmaku (2011) (Tensouder Voice, Narrator)
Tensou Sentai Goseiger Returns (2011) (Master Head, Tensouder Voice, Narrator)
Gokaiger Goseiger Super Sentai 199 Hero Great Battle (2011) (Tensouder Voice)
Kaizoku Sentai Gokaiger vs. Space Sheriff Gavan: The Movie (2012) (Tensouder Voice)
Kaitou Sentai Lupinranger VS Keisatsu Sentai Patranger (2018) (Arsène Lupin (ep. 18, 34, 44))

Dubbing

Live-action
Ant-Man (Mitchell Carson (Martin Donovan))
Australia (Ivan (Jacek Koman))
Cliffhanger (1997 NTV edition) (Kynette (Leon Robinson))
Crimson Tide (Lieutenant Bobby Dougherty (James Gandolfini))
Domestic Disturbance (Ray Coleman (Steve Buscemi))
Don't Breathe (Norman Nordstrom (Stephen Lang))
Don't Breathe 2 (Norman Nordstrom (Stephen Lang))
Downsizing (Joris Konrad (Udo Kier))
Gilda (Det. Maurice Obregon (Joseph Calleia))
The Irishman (Frank "The Irishman" Sheeran (Robert De Niro))
Jennifer 8 (Sgt. John "J.K." Taylor (Graham Beckel))
Matchstick Men (Chuck Frechette (Bruce McGill))
The Matrix Reloaded (Councillor West (Cornel West))
The Matrix Revolutions (Councillor West (Cornel West))
Miracles (Tiger (Ko Chun-hsiung))
The Monuments Men (2nd Lt. Donald Jeffries (Hugh Bonneville))
Mortal Engines (Governor Kwan (Kee Chan))
Painted Faces (Wah (Lam Ching-ying))
The Perfect Host (Warwick Wilson (David Hyde Pierce))
Predator 2 (Detective Danny Archuleta (Rubén Blades))
The Quiet Man (2017 Star Channel edition) (Father Peter Lonergan (Ward Bond))
Rough Magic (Doc Ansell (Jim Broadbent))
Sonic the Hedgehog (Commander Walters (Tom Butler))
Sonic the Hedgehog 2 (Commander Walters (Tom Butler))
Twin Peaks (Leland Palmer (Ray Wise))
U-571 (Maj. Matthew Coonan (David Keith))

Animation
Samurai Jack (Scotsman)

References

External links
Ikuya Sawaki at Arts Vision (Japanese)

Ikuya Sawaki  at Ryu's Seiyuu Info

1951 births
Living people
Japanese male video game actors
Japanese male voice actors
Voice actors from Chiba (city)
Male voice actors from Chiba Prefecture
20th-century Japanese male actors
21st-century Japanese male actors
Arts Vision voice actors